Dr. Holl is a 1951 West German drama film directed by Rolf Hansen and starring Maria Schell, Dieter Borsche and Carl Wery. At the 1st Berlin International Film Festival it won the Certificate of Honour award. It was shot at the Bavaria Studios in Munich and on location in Rome  and around Sorrento and the Gulf of Naples. The film's sets were designed by the art director Robert Herlth.

Plot
The industrialist Alberti is a very wealthy man, but is concerned about Angelika, his fragile, anemic daughter.  She is terminally ill and frequently bedridden. Alberti would give all his wealth if he could do anything for Angelika. Alberti had consulted any doctors about his daughter's case, but every effort was in vain. The doctors have long given up. But to "give up" does not appear in the vocabulary of Angelika's father. Only in the medical student Helga, who earns her living as a nurse, does he find an ally.

Helga is as good as gold, and she has a fiancé, Dr. Holl, a medical researcher, who works day and night in the laboratory.  Holl appears to be well on its way to becoming a great doctor. When he learns of the "hopeless" case of Angelika Alberti, he determines to focus entirely on it. Helga persuades Holl to go with her to the home of Alberti and continue his research there. In the old Alberti, Holl and Helga find a generous benefactor for all their expenses, including construction of a medical laboratory.

Angelika, who knows nothing of the relationship between Holl and Helga, falls in love with her benefactor, Dr. Holl. Unselfishly, Helga is willing to allow Holl to marry Angelika, so that she might die in the intoxication of happiness. Because of Angelika's condition, Helga is confident that this marriage is unlikely to continue indefinitely. Out of pity Holl falls in love with Angelika. However, Dr. Holl's research succeeds in developing a medicine that can save Angelika, who becomes healthier day by day. She begins to play the piano and sings. Helga is in disbelief, as she had never imagined such an outcome.

Soon, however, Helga begins to realize that Angelika is taking away her fiancé, as she becomes healthier with every passing day. Finally Holl who is considering to make a hasty retreat, slipped her and Helga are grudgingly him free. The old Alberti so excited by Angelika's recovery and the prospect of his formerly sick daughter marrying her dream man, that he seeks to financially compensate Helga for her loss. Alberti offers to donate an entire hospital to Helga. Helga a very modern woman of 1951, decides to take this opportunity to undertake a professional career.

Cast
 Maria Schell as Angelika Alberti
 Dieter Borsche as Dr. Holl
 Heidemarie Hatheyer as Helga Roemer
 Carl Wery as Alberti
 Otto Gebühr as Professor Amriss
 Franz Schafheitlin as Professor Godenbergh
 Gerd Brüdern as Corvus
 Lina Carstens as Frau von Bergmann
 Claire Reigbert as Margret / The Housekeeper
 Adrian Hoven as Tonio / Gardener
 Marianne Koch as Anna
 Gustav Waldau as Pfarrer / The Priest

References

External links

1951 films
1951 romantic drama films
German black-and-white films
Films directed by Rolf Hansen
1950s German-language films
German romantic drama films
Medical-themed films
Films with screenplays by Thea von Harbou
West German films
1950s German films
Films shot at Bavaria Studios
Films shot in Italy
Films set in Italy